Ekperigin is a surname. Notable people with the surname include: 

Laurence Ekperigin (born 1988), British-American basketball player
Naomi Ekperigin, American comedian, actress, and writer